Northfield School & Sports College is a comprehensive secondary school in Billingham, north-east England.

History
The school was established in 1972. It was awarded specialist Sports College status in 1999, and in 2008 was awarded a second specialism as a Training School. The first headteacher, Dennis Armitage was succeeded in 1989 by David Youldon and in 2010 by Craig Walker. In 2009/2010 it merged with Billingham Campus School, with both named Northfield School. In December 2018, Richard Henderson took over as headteacher.

Notable former pupils
 Jamie Bell, actor famous for the role of Billy Elliot, and Griffin in the film Jumper
Andrew Davies, former Middlesbrough F.C. and Southampton F.C. footballer currently with Bradford City F.C.
Tommy Mooney, former footballer
Paul Smith, the frontman of Indie group Maxïmo Park
Mark Davies, former Durham County and England Lions cricket player
Brad Walker, professional footballer
Richard Kilty, world indoor 60m champion and European indoor champion sprinter
Zooey Perry, Premier League Handball player currently playing in Oslo, Norway

References

External links 

Secondary schools in the Borough of Stockton-on-Tees
Community schools in the Borough of Stockton-on-Tees
Billingham